Russell Temple Kelley (September 10, 1877 – February 20, 1952) was an Ontario insurance broker and political figure. He represented Hamilton—Wentworth in the Legislative Assembly of Ontario as a Progressive Conservative member from 1945 to 1951.

Background
He was born in Huron County, Ontario in 1877, the son of James Kelley. In 1910, he married Grace Gillespie Powis.

Politics
Kelley served as Minister of Health in the provincial cabinet from 1946 to 1950; he was also Minister Without Portfolio from 1950 to 1951. He served as president of the local Chamber of Commerce and was director of the local YMCA. He died at his home in Hamilton in 1952. He had been in declining health ever since suffering a stroke during a sitting of the legislature in his final term.

Cabinet positions

References

External links 

 Hamilton Gallery of Distinction, Hamilton Public Library

1877 births
1952 deaths
Members of the Executive Council of Ontario
People from Huron County, Ontario
Progressive Conservative Party of Ontario MPPs